Johann Vierdanck (also Virdanck, Vyrdanck, Feyertagk, Feyerdank, Fierdanck; ca. 1605–1646) was a German violinist, cornettist, and composer of the Baroque period.

Life 
Vierdanck was born near Dresden. In 1615 he joined the court chapel of Dresden, where he became a student of Heinrich Schütz and of William Brade. His instrumental works were influenced by the Italian violinist Carlo Farina, also active in the Dresden court.

After visits to Copenhagen and Lübeck, Vierdanck occupied the post of organist in Stralsund from 1635 until his death. He was buried in Stralsund on 1 April 1646.

The group Parnassi Musici has recorded several of his instrumental works, from his 1641 publication, for the CD label Classic Produktion Osnabrück.

Compositions
Instrumental
Erster Theil Newer Pavanen, Gagliarden, Balletten vnd Correnten m. 2 V. u. einem Violon nebenst dem basso continuo (1637, Greifswald)
Ander Theil darinnen begriffen etliche Capricci, Canzoni vnd Sonaten mit 2. 3. 4. und 5. Instrumenten ohne und mit dem Basso Continuo (1641, Rostock)
Vocal Music
Erster Theil Geistlichen Concerten für 2 - 4 St. und B.c. (Greifswald, 1641/43)
Ander Theil Geistlicher Concerten mit 3. 4. 5. 6. 7. 8. vnd 9. St. nebenst einem gedoppelten B.c. (Rostok, 1643)
Cantate: Der Herr hat seinen Engeln befohlen
Cantate: Ich freue mich im Herrn  (Greifswald, 1643)
Cantate: Stehe auf, meine Freundin
1 Motet for four voices and B.c. (1641)

Recordings 
Johann Vierdanck. 20 Capricci, Canzoni & Sonatas. Parnassi musici. CPO 2007
The Trio Sonata in 17th Century-Germany. London Baroque. [therein: Suite A-Dur]. BIS 2008
Machet die Tore Weit. Innsbrucker Capellknaben, Howard Arman. [therein: Ich verkündige euch große Freude]. Tyrolis 1997
Die Herrlichkeit der Erden muß Rauch und Asche werden. Musik und Poesie aus der Zeit des 30jährigen Krieges. Musica Fiorita, Daniela Dolci. [therein: Capriccio Nr. 17, Singet dem Herrn]. AM 1997
Wedding Motets. Weser Renaissance, Manfred Cordes. [therein: Capriccio, Ich freue mich im Herren]. CPO 2006
His Majestys Sagbutts Grand Tour. His Majestys Sagbutts & Cornetts. [therein: Sonata 28, Sonata 31 ("Als ich einmal Lust bekam"). Hyperion 1996

Further reading 
Weiß, Gerhard: Johann Vierdanck (ca. 1605-1646). Sein Leben und sein Werk. Phil. Diss. Marburg, 1956

References

External links

1605 births
1646 deaths
17th-century classical composers
German Baroque composers
German male classical composers
German violinists
German male violinists
German trombonists
Male trombonists
Pupils of Heinrich Schütz
17th-century male musicians